Siren is a genus of aquatic salamanders of the family Sirenidae. The genus consists of three living species, along with one extinct species from the Eocene Epoch and three from the Miocene.

The living species have elongated, eel-like bodies, with two small vestigial fore legs.

Species
Extant (living) species include:
Siren intermedia Barnes, 1826 – lesser siren
Siren lacertina Linnaeus, 1766 – greater siren
Siren reticulata Graham, Kline, Steen & Kelehear, 2018 – reticulated siren or leopard eel

Extinct species:
†Siren dunni Goin & Auffenberg, 1957
†Siren hesterna Herre, 1955
†Siren miotexana Holman, 1977
†Siren simpsoni Herre, 1955

See also
Pseudobranchus, dwarf sirens

Notes

References

Sirenoidea
Extant Eocene first appearances
Amphibian genera